is a Japanese animation studio founded on September 24, 1998, as Synergy Japan which originally split off from Studio Junio (which itself was founded by Toei Animation staff). In 2005, the company became associated with Shogakukan-Shueisha Productions, a subsidiary of the Shogakukan publishing company. In April 2017, the company became a subsidiary of Shin-Ei Animation.

On July 29, 2022, according to their official website, they no longer producing Shogakukan shows and they removed them to the site.

Television series
Princess Comet (2001–2002, with Nippon Animation)
Mermaid Melody Pichi Pichi Pitch (2003-2004, with Actas) (now listed in Actas' productions)
Panda-Z (2004)
MÄR (2005–2007)
Kirarin Revolution (2006–2009) (now listed in G&G Entertainment's productions)
Shinseiki Duel Masters Flash (2006–2007)
Hayate the Combat Butler (2007-2008, episodes 1–52)
Major (2007–2010, episodes 79–154)
Zettai Karen Children (2008–2009)
Gokujō!! Mecha Mote Iinchō (2009–2011, with Shogakukan Music & Digital Entertainment)
Beyblade: Metal Fusion (2009–2010)
Cross Game (2009-2010)
Beyblade: Metal Masters (2010–2011)
Scan2Go (2010–2011)
Beyblade: Metal Fury (2011–2012)
B-Daman Crossfire (2011–2012)
Chibi Devi! (2011–2014)
Beyblade: Shogun Steel (2012, with Nelvana Animation)
BeyWheelz (2012)
B-Daman Fireblast (2012–2013)
Initial D Fifth Stage (2012–2013)
Beast Saga (2013)
BeyWarriors: BeyRaiderz (2014)
Initial D Final Stage (2014)
BeyWarriors: Cyborg (2014–2015)
Battle Game in 5 Seconds (2021, with Vega Entertainment)
Taisho Otome Fairy Tale (2021)
A Couple of Cuckoos (2022, with Shin-Ei Animation)
Too Cute Crisis (2023)
Sweet Reincarnation (2023)
Mr. Villain's Day Off (TBA, with Shin-Ei Animation)

OVA/ONAs
Zettai Karen Children (2010)
Kings of My Love (2011–2013)
The Magic of Chocolate (2011–2013)
Ijime (2012)
Age 12 (2014–2016)

Films
Metal Fight Beyblade vs the Sun: Sol Blaze, the Scorching Hot Invader (2010)
Happy ComeCome (2015)
Gō-chan. ~Moco to Koori no Ue no Yakusoku~ (2018, with Shin-Ei Animation)
Animation x Paralympic: Harigane Service (2022)
Ten Count (2023, with East Fish Studio)

References

External links 
  
 

Japanese animation studios
Mass media companies established in 1998
Japanese companies established in 1998